David Lee Bruton Jr. (born July 23, 1987) is a former American football strong safety and special teamer. He was drafted by the Denver Broncos in the fourth round of the 2009 NFL Draft. He played college football at Notre Dame. He was also a member of the Washington Redskins.

High school career
Bruton attended Miamisburg High School in Miamisburg, Ohio. As a senior, he recorded 54 tackles, three interceptions and broke up seven passes on defense, while catching 10 passes for 200 yards on offense. He earned All-Division I-II all-area honors from Dayton Daily News and won all-district honors on defense.

College career
Bruton played four seasons for Notre Dame, playing as a starter in his junior and senior seasons. Bruton finished his career with 214 total tackles and seven interceptions. His best season came as a senior, when he finished second on the team with 97 total tackles and had a team-high four interceptions. In Bruton's final college game, he had an interception in the Hawaii Bowl, helping Notre Dame win its first bowl game since the 1993 season. Bruton graduated from Notre Dame in 2009 with a bachelor's degree, majoring in political science and sociology.

Professional career

Denver Broncos
Bruton was selected in the fourth round (114th overall) of the 2009 NFL Draft by the Denver Broncos. Before the 2009 season, Bruton signed a four-year contract with Denver. Bruton made his first career start on December 20, 2009 against the Oakland Raiders where he recorded 4 tackles. Bruton finished his rookie 2009 season with 14 total tackles. During the lockout he has taken a job as a substitute teacher in Miamisburg Ohio.

Bruton provides the Broncos with depth at the safety position, yet he is mostly used on special teams and is considered one of the best special teamers in the league. Bruton has been the Broncos' special teams captain for the 2013–2015 seasons.

On March 11, 2013, Bruton re-signed with the Broncos on a three-year contract.

On December 20, 2015, in a game against the Pittsburgh Steelers, Bruton suffered a broken fibula early into the game. However, he refused to be taken out of the game and instead played through the rest of it. He was on the field for 77 plays with the broken leg before being taken off late in the fourth quarter. The Broncos would go on to lose the game 34–27. Two days later, the Broncos placed him on injured reserve.

On February 7, 2016, Bruton was part of the Broncos team that won Super Bowl 50. In the game, the Broncos defeated the Carolina Panthers by a score of 24–10. However, he did not play in the game due to injury.

Washington Redskins
Bruton signed with the Washington Redskins on a three–year, $9 million contract on March 15, 2016. He was placed on injured reserve on October 5, 2016. He was released by the Redskins on December 2, 2016.

Retirement
On July 24, 2017, Bruton announced his retirement from the NFL due to health concerns after suffering six concussions in eight seasons in the league.

Career Statistics

Personal life
During the 2011 NFL offseason, Bruton served as an elementary and high school substitute teacher in his former school district in Miamisburg, Ohio. He obtained a one-year license to substitute teach from the Ohio Department of Education.

Bruton was selected as the Broncos' 2015 Walter Payton NFL Man of the Year. He was recognized for his community and charity efforts including work with his charity, "Bruton's Books".

In 2021 he received a doctorate degree in physical therapy from the University of Colorado.

References

External links
Official website
Washington Redskins bio
Denver Broncos bio
Notre Dame Fighting Irish bio
Bruton's Books website

1987 births
Living people
People from Miamisburg, Ohio
People from Winchester, Kentucky
Players of American football from Ohio
American football safeties
Notre Dame Fighting Irish football players
Denver Broncos players
Washington Redskins players